Tegh is a village and the center of the Tegh Municipality of the Syunik Province in Armenia. Tegh is the last village on the Goris-Stepanakert Highway before passing the border with the Republic of Artsakh. 

Of significance in the village, are the dozens of visible caves present near Tegh. The village is underlaid by a soft stone layer of porous rock, replete with rows of caves that were once used for human habitation, now largely used for animals. There are also some very large ones facing highway M12. Rows of them are visible from the highway while driving east.

Demographics

Population 
The Statistical Committee of Armenia reported its population was 2,520 in 2010, up from 2,333 at the 2001 census.

Gallery

References 

Communities in Syunik Province
Populated places in Syunik Province
Elizavetpol Governorate